The third season of Haikyu!! anime television series, titled , is produced by Production I.G. and directed by Susumu Mitsunaka, with Taku Kishimoto handling series composition and Takahiro Kishida providing character designs. It adapted the second half of "Spring High Preliminary" story arc (chapters 150–207), with the exception of chapters 191–206 from the original manga series of the same name written by Haruichi Furudate. It was aired from October 8 to December 10, 2016. Sentai Filmworks has also licensed the third season.

The opening theme song is "Hikariare" by Burnout Syndromes, while the ending theme song is "Mashi Mashi" by Nico Touches the Walls.



Episode list

References

2016 Japanese television seasons
Haikyu!! episode lists
Haikyu!!